Quadrophenia Live in London is a live release from British rock band, The Who. It documents their 8 July 2013 concert at London's Wembley Arena, the final show of their 2013 tour. It is available as a double-CD album, DVD, Blu-ray and deluxe box set and was released on 9 June 2014. The DVD debuted at number 1 on the Billboard Music Video Sales Chart.

Track listing

Deluxe Edition 

The deluxe edition contains:

Concert Blu-ray
Concert DVD
Concert double-CD
5.1 surround sound mix of the full original 1973 Quadrophenia album
10-inch metal "mod scooter headlight" box
Mod headlight badge
6-inch mod headlight sticker
32-page booklet with photos and liner notes

Personnel 

The Who

 Pete Townshend – guitars, vocals
 Roger Daltrey – vocals, tambourine, harmonica, acoustic guitar
with:
 John Entwistle – bass solo on "5:15" (from video recording live show, 27 November 2000, at Royal Albert Hall)
 Keith Moon – vocals on "Bell Boy" (from video recording of live show, 18 May 1974, at Charlton)

Additional musicians

 Simon Townshend – guitars, backing vocals (lead vocals on "The Dirty Jobs")
 Frank Simes – keyboards, musical director, backing vocals
 Pino Palladino – bass
 Scott Devours – drums, percussion
 John Corey – piano, keyboards, backing vocals
 Loren Gold – keyboards, backing vocals
 Dylan Hart – horns
 Reggie Grisham – horns

Charts

References 

The Who live albums
2014 live albums
Quadrophenia
Albums produced by Pete Townshend